Golikovia ennae (also known as Neptunea ennae) is a species of Buccinidae. It is distributed in the Sea of Japan and the East China Sea. The species was first described by Sakurai, K.I. & R. Chiba, in 1969.

References

External links

Buccinidae
Gastropods described in 1969
Marine gastropods